Vidanovci is a small settlement in the Slovene Hills west of Ljutomer in northeastern Slovenia. The area traditionally belonged to the Styria region and is now included in the Mura Statistical Region.

References

External links
Vidanovci on Geopedia

Populated places in the Municipality of Ljutomer